Sergeant Swell of the Mounties is a 1972 short film written and directed by Len Janson and Chuck Menville, and starring Menville in the title role. Sergeant Swell short films were featured on the Glen Campbell Goodtime Hour during the 1971 season, which began on September 14, 1971.

The film is a pixilation spoof of Sergeant Preston of the Yukon.

External links

1972 films
American animated short films
Stop-motion animated short films
Royal Canadian Mounted Police in fiction
Pixilation films
1972 animated films
1970s English-language films
1970s American films